Connor Morgans (born 26 November 1999) is a presenter and producer working across radio and podcasts, currently broadcasting on Radio Cardiff.

Early life
Morgans was born in Swansea, Wales and grew up in  Pencoed, Wales.

Career 
He currently presents the weekend breakfast programme for Radio Cardiff on the current Welsh music scene, playing emerging artists.

Morgans previously presented for Bridgend's Hospital Radio, he won Gold for Best Male Presenter at the HBA UK Awards in 2022. 

In August 2022, Bridgend's Hospital Radio nominated Morgans as a trustee making him the youngest trustee in hospital radio.

Personal life 
In March 2022, Morgans married a Wales Rugby Union shirt on the Capital South Wales drive-time show with Josh & Kally during an on-air stunt.

Awards and nominations

References

External links 

 Wake Up to the Weekend (Radio Cardiff)
 
 

Living people
People from Swansea
Welsh radio presenters
1999 births